Stempfferia badura is a butterfly in the family Lycaenidae. It is found in Cameroon, the Republic of the Congo, Gabon, the Democratic Republic of the Congo and Uganda.

Subspecies
Stempfferia badura badura (Cameroon, Congo, Gabon, Democratic Republic of the Congo)
Stempfferia badura contrasta Libert, 1999 (Democratic Republic of the Congo, Uganda)

References

Butterflies described in 1890
Poritiinae
Butterflies of Africa